Zayandeh Rud (formerly, Bābā Sheykh ‘Alī (Persian: بابا شیخ علی), also Romanized as Bābā Sheykh ‘Alī) is a city in the Central District of Lenjan County, Isfahan Province, Iran. At the 2006 census, its population was 9,891, in 2,715 families.

References

Populated places in Lenjan County

Cities in Isfahan Province